Aurelius Battaglia (January 16, 1910 – May 29, 1984) was an American illustrator, muralist, writer, and director.

Early life
Battaglia was born in Washington, D.C., in 1910. He was the son of Giuseppe and Concetta Battaglia, who had emigrated from Cefalù, Italy. He attended the Corcoran School of Art. He graduated, winning $50 in a Corcoran-sponsored art contest.

Battaglia married fellow student Edith Richmond after they graduated from Corcoran School of Art in 1932. They bartered paintings for dental work and other necessities. He worked as a caricaturist for The Washington Star and Reporter. In 1934, the Public Works of Art Project commissioned Battaglia to paint murals in the children's section of the library in the Mount Pleasant neighborhood of Washington where he resided. The result is a whimsical panorama of anthropomorphic animals at play, still viewable on the second floor of the Mount Pleasant Library. He later worked for the Resettlement Administration, a New Deal federal agency that, between April 1935 and December 1936, relocated struggling urban and rural families to communities planned by the federal government.

Move to California and subsequent career
Battaglia migrated west in the late 1930s and worked for the Walt Disney Studios from 1937 to 1941. Battaglia started as an in-betweener and soon after moved to the story department. He worked on Dumbo, Fantasia, and Pinocchio and is credited as one of the writers of the latter. Battaglia participated in the Disney animators' strike. He was fired but later rehired. He also worked briefly for Warner Brothers and made training films for the navy during World War II.

In the mid-1950s, Battaglia joined United Productions of America. There he directed the short film The Invisible Moustache of Raoul Dufy, which was nominated for a BAFTA award, and worked on "The Beanstalk Trial"

Battaglia was a prolific children's book illustrator, favoring bold colors and stylized pen and brush work. Titles include "Cowboy Jack, the Sheriff," "The Fire Engine Book," "Little Boy With a Big Horn," "When I Met Robin," "Captain Kangaroo's Read-Aloud Book," and "The Fireside Book of American Folk Songs." He contributed to the Childcraft book series published by Field Enterprises.

Battaglia moved to Provincetown, Massachusetts, where he continued to work until his death in May 1984.

Illustrated books

References

External links
 

1910 births
1984 deaths
20th-century American painters
Artists from Washington, D.C.
American illustrators
American people of Italian descent
Public Works of Art Project artists
George Washington University Corcoran School alumni
American male painters
American muralists
Walt Disney Animation Studios people